"Lost Someone" is a song recorded by James Brown in 1961. It was written by Brown and Famous Flames members Bobby Byrd and Baby Lloyd Stallworth. Like "Please, Please, Please" before it, the song's lyrics combine a lament for lost love with a plea for forgiveness. The single was a #2 R&B hit and reached #48 on the pop chart. According to Brown, "Lost Someone" is based on the chord changes of the Conway Twitty song "It's Only Make Believe". Although Brown's vocal group, The Famous Flames did not actually sing on this tune, two of them , Bobby Byrd, and "Baby Lloyd " Stallworth , co-wrote it with Brown, and Byrd plays organ on the record, making it , in effect, a James Brown/Famous Flames recording.

Personnel
 James Brown – lead vocal

with the James Brown Band:
 Roscoe Patrick – trumpet
 J.C. Davis – tenor saxophone
 Bobby Byrd – Hammond organ
 Les Buie – guitar
 Hubert Parry – bass guitar
 Nat Kendrick – drums
 Other instruments unknown

Live at the Apollo version
A performance of "Lost Someone" is the centerpiece of Brown's 1963 album Live at the Apollo. Nearly 11 minutes long and spanning two tracks on the original LP release (the end of Side 1 and the beginning of Side 2), it is widely regarded as the album's high point and as one of the greatest performances in its idiom on record. Critic Peter Guralnick wrote of the recording:

Here, in a single, multilayered track ... you have embodied the whole history of soul music, the teaching, the preaching, the endless assortment of gospel effects, above all the groove that was at the music's core. "Don't go to strangers," James pleads in his abrasively vulnerable fashion. "Come on home to me.... Gee whiz I love you.... I'm so weak...." Over and over he repeats the simple phrases, insists "I'll love you tomorrow" until the music is rocking with a steady pulse, until the music grabs you in the pit of the stomach and James knows he's got you. Then he works the audience as he works the song, teasing, tantalizing, drawing closer, dancing away, until finally at the end of Side I that voice breaks through the crowd noise and dissipates the tension as it calls out, "James, you're an asshole." "I believe someone out there loves someone," declares James with cruel disingenuousness. "Yeah, you," replies a girl's voice with unabashed fervor. "I feel so good I want to scream," says James, testing the limits yet again. "Scream!" cries a voice. And the record listener responds, too, we are drawn in by the same tricks, so transparent in the daylight but put across with the same unabashed fervor with which the girl in the audience offers up her love. 

An edited version of the live performance was released as a single in 1966 and charted at #94 on the US Pop chart.

Long, drawn-out performances of "Lost Someone" continued to be a feature of Brown's live shows until 1966, when "It's a Man's Man's Man's World" largely supplanted it in his concert repertoire. Brown would sometimes interpolate parts of "Lost Someone" into the newer song, as in the 1967 performance documented on Live at the Apollo, Volume II.

Personnel
 James Brown – lead vocal

with the James Brown Band:
 Lewis Hamlin – music director, principal trumpet
 Roscoe Patrick – trumpet
 Teddy Washington – trumpet
 Dickie Wells – trombone
 William "Po' Devil" Burgess – alto saxophone
 St. Clair Pinckney – principal tenor saxophone
 Al "Briscoe" Clark – tenor and baritone saxophones
 Les Buie – guitar
 Bobby Byrd – Hammond organ
 Hubert Parry – bass guitar
 Clayton Fillyau – principal drums
 Probably George Sims – drums

Other versions
Brown made several other recordings of "Lost Someone", including:
 A version with strings for his 1963 album Prisoner of Love
 A studio version similar to the 1962 Apollo performance on 1972's Get On The Good Foot
 An uptempo version on 1974's Hell

Covers
 The Residents recorded a satirical cover version of the intro to "Lost Someone" for their 1984 tribute album George & James.
 Cat Power recorded "Lost Someone" for her 2008 album Jukebox.

References

James Brown songs
1961 singles
1966 singles
Songs written by James Brown
Songs written by Bobby Byrd
1961 songs
King Records (United States) albums